Bob Mancini (born March 16, 1958) is a current regional manager for the USA Hockey American Development Model and the former head coach and assistant coach at the collegiate, International, and junior levels.

Coaching career
He also has coached in the NCAA ranks at Michigan Tech and Ferris State University. During his tenure as the head coach of the Michigan Tech Huskies Mancini led the Huskies to three Western Collegiate Hockey Association Final Five appearances.

Mancini served as an assistant coach and the director of player personnel for the USA Hockey National Team Development Program from 1997-2000.

He became the head coach and general manager of the Saginaw Spirit ice hockey team of the Ontario Hockey League in 2005 when Mancini took over the duties from Doug Lidster. He spent a little over three seasons as head coach from 2005-2007. Mancini led the Spirit to the team's first two playoff appearances in 2006, 2007 and the team's most successful season in terms of wins and points during the 2006-07 season.

Following his stint with the Spirit, Mancini joined the Edmonton Oilers organization as the Oilers Development Coach to work with the team's AHL and ECHL prospects.

In 2009 he left the Oilers organization to become a regional manager with the new USA Hockey American Development Model.

Pop culture
He has appeared on the Colbert Report on December 5, 2006 to discuss his team's current three game losing streak, again on January 25, 2007 to discuss a game against rival team Oshawa Generals, and March 22, 2007 to discuss his team's upcoming playoff series.

Head coaching record

College

References

External links

1958 births
Living people
Colorado College Tigers men's ice hockey players
Ferris State Bulldogs men's ice hockey coaches
Ice hockey coaches from New York (state)
Michigan Tech Huskies men's ice hockey coaches
Saginaw Spirit coaches
People from Seaford, New York
American men's ice hockey forwards
Ice hockey players from New York (state)